January 10 - Eastern Orthodox liturgical calendar - January 12

All fixed commemorations below are observed on January 24 by Eastern Orthodox Churches on the Old Calendar.

For January 11th, Orthodox Churches on the Old Calendar commemorate the Saints listed on December 29.

Feasts
 Afterfeast of the Theophany of Our Lord and Savior Jesus Christ.

Saints
 Martyr Mairus (Mairos).
 Martyrs Peter, Severius and Leucius, at Alexandria.
 Venerable Theodosius of Antioch, ascetic of Rhosus and Antioch, Wonderworker (412)  (see also: February 5 - Greek)
 Venerable Theodosius the Cenobiarch (Theodosius the Great)  (529)
 Venerable Theodorus, and Venerable Archimandrite Agapius of Apamea in Syria.
 Venerable Vitalis of Gaza (Vitalios), of the monastery of Abba Seridus at Gaza (c. 609 - 620)

Pre-Schism Western saints
 Hieromartyr Hyginus, Pope of Rome (142)
 Saint Leucius of Brindisi, venerated as the first Bishop of Brindisi, where he had come as a missionary from Alexandria (180)
 Hieromartyr Alexander of Fermo, Bishop, martyred under Decius (c. 250)
 Saints Ethenia and Fidelmia, Princesses, daughters of King Laoghaire in Ireland, veiled as nuns by St Patrick (433)
 Martyr Salvius, in North Africa, eulogized by St Augustine.
 Saint Brandan, Abbot, opponent of Pelagianism (5th century)
 Saint Honorata, nun, sister of St. Epiphanius of Pavia, who ransomed her after she was abducted from the monastery of St. Vincent in Pavia (c. 500)
 Saint Anastasius of Castel Sant'Elia, Abbot (c. 570)
 Saint Boadin the Irish, hermit in Gaul.
 Saints Paldo, Taso and Tato, three brothers, Abbots of San Vincenzo on the Voltorno (8th century)

Post-Schism Orthodox saints
 Venerable Theodosius of Mt. Athos, Metropolitan of Trebizond (1392.)
 Venerable Michael of Klopsk, of Klopsk Monastery in Novgorod, Fool-for-Christ and Wonderworker (1456)
 New Martyr Nikephoros of Crete, by hanging, for renouncing Islam and confessing his faith in Christ (1832)
 Saint Joseph the New of Cappadocia (c. 1860)

New martyrs and confessors
 New Hieromartyrs, Priests:(1919)
 Nicholas Matsievsky of Perm
 Theodore Antipin of Perm
 Vladimir Fokin of Krasnoyarsk
 New Hiero-Confessor Vladimir (Khirasko), Archpriest, of Minsk (1932)

Other commemorations
 Synaxis of the Myriads of Holy Angels (Synaxis of the Myriangelon).
 Consecration of the Church of St. Stephen in Placidia Palace, Constantinople.
 Chernigov-Eletskaya Icon of the Most Holy Theotokos (1060)
 Repose of Blessed Nun Eupraxia of Teliakov village, Kostroma (1823)

Icon gallery

Notes

References

Sources
 January 11/January 24. Orthodox Calendar (PRAVOSLAVIE.RU).
 January 24 / January 11. HOLY TRINITY RUSSIAN ORTHODOX CHURCH (A parish of the Patriarchate of Moscow).
 January 11. OCA - The Lives of the Saints.
 The Autonomous Orthodox Metropolia of Western Europe and the Americas (ROCOR). St. Hilarion Calendar of Saints for the year of our Lord 2004. St. Hilarion Press (Austin, TX). p. 7.
 January 11. Latin Saints of the Orthodox Patriarchate of Rome.
 The Roman Martyrology. Transl. by the Archbishop of Baltimore. Last Edition, According to the Copy Printed at Rome in 1914. Revised Edition, with the Imprimatur of His Eminence Cardinal Gibbons. Baltimore: John Murphy Company, 1916. pp. 11–12.
Greek Sources
 Great Synaxaristes:  11 ΙΑΝΟΥΑΡΙΟΥ. ΜΕΓΑΣ ΣΥΝΑΞΑΡΙΣΤΗΣ.
  Συναξαριστής. 11 Ιανουαρίου. ECCLESIA.GR. (H ΕΚΚΛΗΣΙΑ ΤΗΣ ΕΛΛΑΔΟΣ). 
Russian Sources
  24 января (11 января). Православная Энциклопедия под редакцией Патриарха Московского и всея Руси Кирилла (электронная версия). (Orthodox Encyclopedia - Pravenc.ru).
  11 января (ст.ст.) 24 января 2013 (нов. ст.). Русская Православная Церковь Отдел внешних церковных связей. (DECR).

January in the Eastern Orthodox calendar